Bianca Ambrosetti (1 March 1914 – 30 November 1928) was an Italian gymnast. At the 1928 Summer Olympics, at the age of 14, she won the silver medal as member of the Italian gymnastics team. Ambrosetti was already ill with tuberculosis during the Olympics and later died from the disease.

References

External links
 
 

1914 births
1928 deaths
Italian female artistic gymnasts
Olympic gymnasts of Italy
Olympic silver medalists for Italy
Olympic medalists in gymnastics
Gymnasts at the 1928 Summer Olympics
Medalists at the 1928 Summer Olympics
Tuberculosis deaths in Italy
20th-century deaths from tuberculosis